Defect or defects may refer to:

Related to failure
 Angular defect, in geometry
 Birth defect, an abnormal condition present at birth
 Crystallographic defect, in the crystal lattice of solid materials
 Latent defect, in the law of the sale of property
 Product defect, a characteristic of a product which hinders its usability
 Software bug, an error in computer software

Other uses
 Defection, abandoning allegiance to one country for another
 The Defects, a Northern Irish punk rock band

See also

 Defective (disambiguation)
 Defected Records, a music label
 Fault (disambiguation)
 Flaw (disambiguation)